Lord Soames may refer to:

Christopher Soames, Baron Soames, former Governor of Southern Rhodesia
Nicholas Soames, Baron Soames, former MP for Mid Sussex and Crawley, and son of Christopher Soames